The MV Cougar Ace was a Singapore-flagged roll-on/roll-off car carrier vessel. The Cougar Ace was built by Kanasashi Co., of Toyohashi, Japan and launched in June 1993. Her Gross Tonnage is 55,328. She is owned by Mitsui O.S.K. Lines.

On 4 May 2005, Cougar Ace delivered 5,214 automobiles at the Fraser River wharves in Richmond, British Columbia.  This set a Canadian record for the most vehicles offloaded from a single ship.

Loss of stability incident
On 23 July 2006, she was en route from  Japan to Vancouver, British Columbia; Tacoma, Washington; and Port Hueneme, California, with a cargo of 4,812 vehicles.  During an exchange of ballast water south of the Aleutian Islands, she lost stability and developed a 60° list to port.  There were reports of a large wave striking the vessel during the ballast transfer, but it is unknown what effect this had on her loss of stability.  
On 24 July, the United States Coast Guard and the 176th Wing of the Alaska Air National Guard successfully rescued the 23 crew members.

4,703 (97.7%) of the vehicles on board were from Mazda; 60% were 2007 Mazda3s and 30% were Mazda CX-7s. The remaining Mazdas were mainly RX-8 and MX-5 models. According to Car and Driver magazine, the exact contents of Mazda's shipment were 2,804 Mazda3, 1,329 CX-7, 295 MX-5, 214 RX-8, 56 Mazda5 and 5 Mazdaspeed6 models. The remaining 2.3% of the vehicles on board (approximately 110 vehicles) were from Isuzu, mostly Isuzu Elf trucks. In total, the cargo had an estimated value of US$117 million.

Salvage effort
A marine salvage team from Titan Salvage arrived on site on 30 July 2006. Led by Salvage Master Captain Rich Habib, the team was able to get aboard the vessel via a U.S. Coast Guard helicopter from the cutter . Later that day naval architect Marty Johnson slipped and fell to his death as the salvage team was preparing to leave the Cougar Ace and board the tugboat Emma Foss. Johnson was a 40-year-old resident of Issaquah, Washington and employee of Crowley, the parent company of Titan Salvage.

Titan Salvage subsequently towed the vessel through Samalga Pass to the north side of the Aleutian Islands for protection from the weather using the tugboats Sea Victory, Gladiator and Emma Foss. It was then taken to Unalaska Island, where it was moored to Icicle Seafoods' mooring buoy. Cougar Ace was righted and redelivered to Mitsui Group on 16 August 2006, and on 25 August put under tow to Portland, Oregon for inspection and repair.

Disposition of cargo
Mazda officials reported minimal damage to the vehicles on board despite the ship listing for over a month. However, according to the US Coast Guard, 41 vehicles broke loose and shifted.

On 11 September 2006, one day before the Cougar Ace arrived in Portland to begin unloading, Mazda USA announced that none of the Mazdas aboard would be sold as new vehicles. Mazda USA published a list of 
VINs for the affected Mazda vehicles on their website.

On 15 December 2006, Mazda announced that all vehicles on the Cougar Ace would be scrapped. After an extensive process to deploy all the airbags in each vehicle, all of the Mazda cars were crushed onsite at the Port of Portland by Pacific Car Crushing.  The last Mazda car from the shipment was crushed on 6 May 2008.

Appearances in media
The Cougar Ace was covered extensively by the automotive press because of the sheer number of new cars that Mazda scrapped after the incident. She has a cameo of sorts in episode one, season three, of the television series Deadliest Catch. She is shown, temporarily anchored in Dutch Harbor in the Aleutian islands, awaiting further recovery.

Scrapping 
In June 2020 MV Cougar Ace was sold for scrap. She was beached at Alang, India on 23 June 2020 and cut up thereafter.

Gallery

See also
List of roll-on/roll-off vessel accidents
, a car carrier which had a major list incident in 2015.
, a car carrier which capsized off Oporto in 1988.

References

External links

BYM News Photo Gallery Album of pictures of Cougar Ace incident
MaritimeDigital Archive Media Library page on Cougar Ace
Autoblog report on the Cougar Ace
Cargo Law updates on the Cougar Ace
US Coast Guard Unified Command
BYM magazine Jan 2007
High Tech Cowboys of the Deep Seas: The Race to Save the Cougar Ace -- Wired magazine Vol 16, issue 03, March 2008
Car and Driver gallery

Maritime incidents in 2006
Articles containing video clips
1993 ships
Internet memes
Ro-ro ships
Ships built in Japan